Henley High School is a public high school in Henley, southeast of Klamath Falls, Oregon, United States in Klamath County.

Academics
In 2017, 98% of the school's seniors received their high school diploma. Of 144 students, 142 graduated, and two dropped out.

Sports

Baseball
Basketball (boys/girls)
Cross country (boys/girls)
Football
Golf (boys/girls)
Soccer (boys/girls)
Softball
Swimming (boys/girls)
Tennis (boys/girls)
Track and field (boys/girls)
Volleyball
Wrestling (boys/girls)

Clubs

DECA 
Air Force JROTC
KEY Club
Yearbook
Marching, Pep, Symphonic, and Jazz band 
Choir
Drama
HOSA
Cheerleading
FFA

References

External links
 
 
 

High schools in Klamath County, Oregon
Buildings and structures in Klamath Falls, Oregon
Public high schools in Oregon